Katharine Park is a Radcliffe Professor of the History of Science at Harvard University. She specializes in the history of gender, sexuality, and the female body in medieval and Renaissance Europe, as well as categories and practices of experience and observation in the Middle Ages. Park was awarded a Marshall Scholarship in 1974. She received her M.Phil in the Combined Historical Studies of the Renaissance at the Warburg Institute, University of London, and earned a Ph.D. in the History of Science at Harvard in 1981.

Awards
Wonders of Nature, which she co-authored with Lorraine Daston, won the Pfizer Award of the History of Science Society for the best book in the history of science in 1999; the book was translated into Italian and German.

In 2002, Park was elected to the American Academy of Arts and Sciences.

Her most recent book, Secrets of Women, won the Margaret W. Rossiter History of Women in Science Prize in 2007. In 2021 she was awarded the Dan David Prize.

Works

Doctors and Medicine in Early Renaissance Florence, Princeton University Press, 1985; 2014 pbk edition
Wonders and the Order of Nature, 1150-1750 with Lorraine Daston, Zone Books, 1998, 
Secrets of Women: Gender, Generation, and the Origins of Human Dissection, Zone Books, 2006,

See also
Clara Claiborne Park - Mother
Paul Park - Brother
Virginia Spotswood McKenney Claiborne - Grandmother
William Robertson McKenney - Great-grandfather
Robert Claiborne - Uncle

Notes

External links
Park's history of science page

American medical historians
Living people
Harvard University faculty
American historians of science
American women historians
Harvard University alumni
Alumni of the Warburg Institute
Year of birth missing (living people)
21st-century American women